Cryptostemma is a genus of bugs in the family Dipsocoridae, first described by Herrich-Schäffer in 1835.  The species Cryptostemma alienum is recorded from northern Europe including the British Isles.

Species 
According to BioLib the following are included:
 Cryptostemma alienum Herrich-Schäffer, 1835
 Cryptostemma carpaticum Josifov, 1967
 Cryptostemma digitum Wu, 1967
 †Cryptostemma eocenica Hartung et al., 2017
 Cryptostemma gracile Josifov, 1967
 Cryptostemma haywardi Wydgodzinsky, 1952
 Cryptostemma hickmani Hill, 1987
 Cryptostemma linguata Nieser, 1973
 Cryptostemma miyamotoi Yamada & Hayashi, 2019
 Cryptostemma monga Hill, 1987
 Cryptostemma pavelstysi Yamada & Hayashi, 2019
 Cryptostemma remanei Josifov, 1964
 Cryptostemma roubali Josifov, 1967
 Cryptostemma triacanthota Hill, 1987
 Cryptostemma uhleri McAtee & Malloch, 1925
 Cryptostemma uriarra Hill, 1987
 Cryptostemma usingeri Wygodzinsky, 1955
 Cryptostemma utnapishtim Linnavuori, 1984
 Cryptostemma wygodzinskyi Wu, 1967

References

External links
 

Heteroptera